Chemical Warfare is the seventh studio album by American rock band Escape the Fate, released on April 16, 2021. The album was produced by the band's lead guitarist Kevin Gruft and John Feldmann, who also previously produced the band's albums This War Is Ours and Ungrateful. The album received mixed reviews.

Track listing

Personnel

Escape the Fate
 Craig Mabbitt – lead vocals
 Kevin Gruft – lead guitar, bass, backing vocals, keyboards
 TJ Bell – rhythm guitar, backing vocals
 Robert Ortiz – drums

Additional musicians
 Brandon Saller - drums, additional vocals 
 Travis Barker - drums, composer 
 Joe Kirkland - piano
 Matt McAndrew - composer
 Nick Anderson - composer
 Lil Aaron - composer

Production
 Kevin Gruft – production, engineering
 John Feldmann - production, engineering, mixing
 Dylan McLean - co-production, engineering, mixing
 Scot Stewart - co-production, engineering, mixing
 Michael Bono - co-production, assistant engineering
 Jake Magness - co-producer, assistant engineering
 Victor Murgatroyd - A&R
 Alec Gousset - assistant engineering
 Josh Thornberry - assistant engineering
 Sus Boy - artwork, design
 Ted Jensen - mastering

Charts

References 

2021 albums
Escape the Fate albums
Eleven Seven Label Group albums
Albums produced by John Feldmann